During Operation Arc Light (sometimes Arclight) from 1965 to 1973, the United States Air Force deployed B-52 Stratofortresses from bases in the U.S. Territory of Guam to provide battlefield air interdiction during the Vietnam War. This included strikes at enemy bases, supply routes, and behind the lines troop concentrations, as well as occasionally providing close air support directly to ground combat operations in Vietnam.

The conventional bombing campaign was supported by ground-control-radar detachments of the 1st Combat Evaluation Group (1CEVG) in Operation Combat Skyspot. Arc Light operations usually targeted enemy base camps, troops concentrations, and supply lines.

Aircraft used 
Previously dedicated to carrying nuclear weapons, the U.S. Air Force began to train strategic bomber crews in 1964 to deliver conventional munitions flying the B-52F.

The B-52Fs were deployed to Andersen Air Force Base on Guam and U-Tapao Royal Thai Navy Airfield in Thailand, southeast of Bangkok. To add conventional bomb capacity, Project Big Belly modified all B-52Ds to enable them to carry 30 tons of conventional bombs.

By mid-April 1966, all B-52Fs were redeployed back to the U.S. and were replaced by Big Belly-modified B-52Ds. Later in the Vietnam War, the B-52G was also deployed with the B-52D.

B-52Ds were also used from the 376th Strategic Wing of Kadena Air Base, Okinawa, Japan. The 96th Strategic Air Wing from Dyess AFB, Texas, deployed for Arc Light in June 1970 for 180 days. Upon completion of the Arc Light deployment, the 376th SW B-52Ds either returned to the continental U.S. or were sent to U-Tapao. The 376th SW then ceased bomber operations, but continued flying Young Tiger tanker missions.

Operations in Laos and Cambodia 

Congressional investigations of secret CIA activities in Laos revealed that B-52s were used to systematically bomb targets within Laos and Cambodia.

Operational use 
The bombers were first used in Southeast Asia on June 18, 1965. Flying from Andersen AFB, Guam, 27 aircraft dropped  and  bombs on a Viet Cong stronghold.

Missions were commonly flown in three-plane formations known as "cells". Releasing their bombs from the stratosphere, the B-52s could neither be seen or heard from the ground. B-52s were instrumental in destroying enemy concentrations besieging Khe Sanh in 1968, and in 1972 at An Loc and Kontum.

Arc Light was re-activated at Andersen on February 8, 1972, when President Richard Nixon resumed bombing of North Vietnam in an effort to move peace talks along. Over 15,000 men were sent to Andersen on temporary duty over the next 90 days. With limited barracks and other facilities, tents were set up for use by men working 80-hour weeks.

Arc Light missions continued until the cessation of hostilities by U.S. forces on August 15, 1973. Between June 1965 and August 1973, 126,615 sorties (B-52D/F/G) were flown over Southeast Asia. During those operations, the U.S. Air Force lost 31 B-52s; 18 were lost from hostile fire over North Vietnam and 13 from operational causes.

The typical full bomb loads were:

 B-52F: 36  and  bombs in a mixed load, or 51 500-lb. bombs, 27 in the bomb bay and 24 on underwing pylons.
 B-52D: 108 500-lb. bombs, or a mixed load of 64 500-lb. bombs in the bomb bay and 24 750-lb. bombs on underwing pylons.
 B-52G: 27 bombs, all in the bomb bay, no external bombs were carried.

Problems
Communication leaks undermined the effectiveness of the campaign. According to Stephen Budiansky, "Despite NSA's occasional success in tightening up particularly leaky communication practices, the problems continued throughout the war. On Andersen the Vietcong were given as much as eight hours' warning and often revealing exact launch times and likely targets. Because of a Russian trawler stationed off the island listening to conversations and seeing actual B-52 launches.

Combat Skyspot Memorial
Nineteen technicians of the 1st Combat Evaluation Group were lost in ground combat. On September 21, 2010, President Barack Obama presented the Medal of Honor to the sons of Chief Master Sergeant Richard L. Etchberger for his actions in the battle of Lima Site 85. A memorial to all 1CEVG technicians is located directly behind the Arc Light memorial.

References

Conflicts in 1965
Battles and operations of the Vietnam War
Aerial operations and battles of the Vietnam War
Battles involving Vietnam
Military operations of the Vietnam War
1965 in Vietnam
1966 in Vietnam
1967 in Vietnam
1968 in Vietnam
1969 in Vietnam
1970 in Vietnam
1971 in Vietnam
1972 in Vietnam
1973 in Vietnam
Battles and operations of the Vietnam War in 1965
Battles and operations of the Vietnam War in 1966
Battles and operations of the Vietnam War in 1967
Battles and operations of the Vietnam War in 1968
Battles and operations of the Vietnam War in 1969
Battles and operations of the Vietnam War in 1970
Battles and operations of the Vietnam War in 1971
Battles and operations of the Vietnam War in 1972
Battles and operations of the Vietnam War in 1973